Probable ATP-dependent RNA helicase DDX17 (p72) is an enzyme that in humans is encoded by the DDX17 gene.

Function 

DEAD box proteins, characterized by the conserved motif Asp-Glu-Ala-Asp (DEAD), are putative RNA helicases. They are implicated in a number of cellular processes involving alteration of RNA secondary structure such as translation initiation, nuclear and mitochondrial splicing, and ribosome and spliceosome assembly. Based on their distribution patterns, some members of this family are believed to be involved in embryogenesis, spermatogenesis, and cellular growth and division. This gene encodes a DEAD box protein, which is an ATPase activated by a variety of RNA species but not by dsDNA. This protein and that encoded by DDX5 gene are more closely related to each other than to any other member of the DEAD box family. Alternative splicing of this gene generates 2 transcript variants encoding different isoforms with the longer transcript reported to also initiate translation at a non-AUG (CUG) start site.

Interactions 

DDX17 has been shown to interact with:
  DDX5 (p68), 
  DHX9 (RNA Helicase A), 
 HDAC1,

References

Further reading 

 
 
 
 
 
 
 
 
 
 
 
 
 
 
 

Spliceosome